Would You Like a Tour? was the third headlining tour by Canadian rapper Drake. It began on October 18, 2013 in Pittsburgh and continued until March 5, 2015 with its final show scheduled in Brisbane, Australia. Scheduled for 66 performances across North America, Europe, and Oceania, the tour was produced by Live Nation in conjunction with his third studio album, Nothing Was the Same.

The tour would begin two months after the fourth annual OVO Festival in Toronto, and featured various opening acts across the different legs of the tour, including Future, Miguel, Jhené Aiko, PARTYNEXTDOOR and The Weeknd. Most of the track-list from Nothing Was the Same was performed, such as singles "Hold On, We're Going Home", "Started from the Bottom", and "Worst Behavior". Additional singles where Drake and the opening act had collaborated on were also performed, including "If Only They Knew", "Crew Love", and "Fo Real".

It would gross over $46,200,000 throughout its duration, making it one of the highest grossing hip-hop tours of all time.

Background
Drake would hint an impending tour, tweeting "Would You Like a Tour?" on June 13, 2013. Later that week, Drake would confirm the tour, announcing that the "Would You Like A Tour?" was set to feature in over 38 stadiums and arenas across the United States and Canada. The tour was scheduled to begin on October 18 in Pittsburgh, and conclude on December 18 in Philadelphia. The "Would You Like a Tour?" concert tour was in support of Drake's third studio album, Nothing Was the Same.

On October 15, 2013, it was reported that Future had been removed from the tour due to disparaging comments made by him towards Drake during a Billboard interview. It was rumored that Future was demanding $1.5 million for lost wages, owing to a reported $40,000 guaranteed payout per gig. Despite this, it was later revealed, however, that Future was not removed from the tour, with Drake confirming that the rapper would remain on the tour. He would later announce that PARTYNEXTDOOR would also be featured on the tour. On October 29, the tour would be extended to a European leg, with The Weeknd performing as the opening act.

Opening acts

Miguel
Future
The Weeknd (Europe)
PARTYNEXTDOOR
Jhené Aiko
2 Chainz
J. Cole
Lil Wayne

Set list

"Tuscan Leather" (First verse)
"Headlines"
"Crew Love"
"Tuscan Leather" (Third verse)
"Furthest Thing"
"Wu-Tang Forever"
"Own It"
"Pop That"
"No New Friends"
"Love Me" (with Future)
"Honest" (with Future)
"Same Damn Time" (with Future)
"Fuckin' Problems"
"The Motto"
"Versace"
"HYFR (Hell Ya Fucking Right)"
"The Motion"
"Come Thru"
"From Time"
"Hold On, We're Going Home"
"Connect"
"Too Much"
"Pound Cake"
"Worst Behavior"
"The Language"
"305 To My City"
"All Me"
"Started from the Bottom"

Notes

Drake performed "Black and Yellow" with Wiz Khalifa at the show in Pittsburgh, Pennsylvania.
Drake performed "Put Your Hands Where My Eyes Can See" with Busta Rhymes at the show in Brooklyn, New York. And he also performed "Work", "Shabba" and "Fuckin' Problems with the A$AP Mob at the same show.
Drake performed "HYFR (Hell Ya Fucking Right)" & "Rich As Fuck" with Lil Wayne at the show in Miami, Florida.
Drake performed "Back That Azz Up" with Juvenile at the show in Dallas, Texas.
Drake performed "November 18th" at the show in Houston, Texas.
Drake performed "The Next Episode", "Nuthin' but a 'G' Thang" and "Drop It Like It's Hot" with Snoop Dogg at the show in Los Angeles, California. He would also perform Make Me Proud with Nicki Minaj and Still Fly with Birdman at the show. 
Drake performed "Worst Behavior" and brought out his father, Dennis Graham, at the show in St. Louis, Missouri.
Drake performed "All Me" with Big Sean at the show in Auburn Hills, Michigan.
Drake performed "Dreams & Nightmares Intro" and "Levels" with Meek Mill at the show in Philadelphia, Pennsylvania. Drake would also bring out Big Sean at the show, performing "All Me and Mercy.
Drake performed "Take Care" with Rihanna at the show in Bercy, Paris. Rihanna also performed "Pour It Up".
Drake would debut "Days in the East" during the second leg of the Birmingham, England shows.
Drake performed "Black Skinhead" with Kanye West at the show in Berlin, Germany. "Trophies", "Best I Ever Had", "Take Care", "Over" and "Successful" would vary as a part of the set list in some shows.
Drake performed "All Me" with 2 Chainz on all Australian dates.

Tour dates

Cancellations and rescheduled shows

Box office score data

References

2013 concert tours
2014 concert tours
2015 concert tours
Drake (musician) concert tours